Helen Strassburger Boatwright (November 17, 1916 – December 1, 2010) was an American soprano who specialized in the performance of American song, recorded the first full-length album of songs by composer Charles Ives and had a career that spanned more than five decades.

Early life and career
Born as Helena Johanna Strassburger in Sheboygan, Wisconsin, she was the youngest of six children in a large German American family. After high school, she studied with Anna Shram Irvin and earned bachelor's and master's degrees in music from Oberlin College. Her operatic debut was as Anna in a production of Otto Nicolai's The Merry Wives of Windsor at Tanglewood.

During her career, she worked with many important figures in the world of music, including conductors Leopold Stokowski, Erich Leinsdorf, Seiji Ozawa and Zubin Mehta. She also performed with Leonard Bernstein at Tanglewood in the 1940s, sang opposite tenor Mario Lanza in his operatic stage debut, and performed for President John F. Kennedy in the East Room of the White House in 1963. In 1954, she became the first person to record a full-length album of Ives' songs, 24 Songs, with pianist John Kirkpatrick. She also studied with composer Normand Lockwood. Another particular favorite composer of hers was Hugo Wolf. She knew his songs intimately, and in her later years she nearly always included a set or even an entire half of a recital of his work.

She met her future husband, violinist Howard Boatwright (who died in 1999), in Los Angeles in 1941 when they were to perform in a National Federation of Music Clubs competition. They married two years later, on June 25, 1943, and had three children. They performed together throughout their married life in North America, Europe, and India. Many of her husband's compositions for voice were written for her. Other notable orchestral and choral groups she sang with were Paul Hindemith's Collegium Musicum, Alfred Mann's Cantata Singers, and Johannes Somary's Amor Artis Chorale.

Later career
In 1964, her husband Howard became the dean of the Syracuse University School of Music and she joined him teaching there. In 1969 the Boatwrights established a university-sponsored summer program, L'École Hindemith in Vevey, Switzerland. They taught and performed there every summer until 1988. She was a professor of voice at the Eastman School of Music in Rochester from 1972 to 1979, and was a guest professor at Cornell University and the Peabody Conservatory of Music at Johns Hopkins University. She also gave master-classes at Glimmerglass Opera, University of Massachusetts Amherst, University of North Carolina and Washington University in St. Louis.

In 2003, Syracuse University presented Boatwright with an honorary doctor of music degree. Boatwright continued to study music and teach, and in 2006, she celebrated her 90th birthday with a standing-room only concert at St. David's Episcopal Church in DeWitt, New York.

Death
Boatwright died on December 1, 2010, aged 94, in Jamesville, New York. Her achievements were honored during the 2011 Grammy Awards.

Partial discography
 24 Songs/Songs From Emily Dickinson – Composers Recordings (2001)
 Handel: Chandos Anthems I-VI – Vanguard (1998)
 Hansel and Gretel (1954) – View Video DVD (2001)
 Chandos Anthems I-VI - Vanguard SRV-227 SD / SRV-229 (1966)
 Music of Franz Tunder - Howard & Helen Boatwright (1954)
 Schubert - Mass No. 6 in E-flat major - Decca DL 9422 (195?)
 The Happiest Millionaire – Disneyland Ster 5001 (196?)

References

External links
 
 Rehearsal with Steven Heyman

1916 births
2010 deaths
American people of German descent
People from Sheboygan, Wisconsin
Oberlin College alumni
Syracuse University faculty
Eastman School of Music faculty
American operatic sopranos
Accidental deaths from falls
Accidental deaths in New York (state)
Cornell University faculty
People from DeWitt, New York
American women academics
21st-century American women